Rosie Dillon (born 19 March 1996) is an Australian rules footballer playing for the St Kilda Football Club in the AFL Women's (AFLW). Dillon was drafted by St Kilda with their second selection and twenty-fourth overall in the 2019 AFL Women's draft.

References

External links 

1996 births
Living people
St Kilda Football Club (AFLW) players
Irish players of Australian rules football
Irish expatriate sportspeople in Australia